Lombardy renewed its delegation to the Italian Senate on May 13, 2001. This election was a part of national Italian general election of 2001 even if, according to the Italian Constitution, every senatorial challenge in each Region is a single and independent race.

The election was won by the centre-right coalition called House of Freedoms, as it happened at the national level. The House was  a new alliance formed for Lombard regional election of 2000 between political giants Pole of Freedoms and Lega Nord. All provinces gave a majority or a plurality to the new Prime Minister of Italy.

Background
Silvio Berlusconi was the largely predicted winner of this election. He had a complete victory during the 1999 European election and, more, he strengthened his position with the alliance between his Pole of Freedoms and his former rivals of Umberto Bossi's Lega Nord, forming the House of Freedoms for the 2000 regional election which gave him a landslide victory. In this context, the majoritarian system was ensuring him a literal triumph in Lombardy.

On the other side, The Olive Tree was coming from five years of troubled government, with three different Prime Ministers, and divisions between member parties obliged to give a nomination to a fourth man, Francesco Rutelli.

Electoral system
The intricate electoral system introduced in 1993, called Mattarella Law, provided 75% of the seats in the Senate as elected by first-past-the-post system, whereas the remaining 25% was assigned by a special proportional method that actually assigned the remaining seats to minority parties.

Formally this was an example of Additional member system.

Results

|-
|- bgcolor="#E9E9E9"
!rowspan="1" align="left" valign="top"|Coalition
!rowspan="1" align="center" valign="top"|votes
!rowspan="1" align="center" valign="top"|votes (%)
!rowspan="1" align="center" valign="top"|seats
!rowspan="1" align="left" valign="top"|Party
!rowspan="1" align="center" valign="top"|seats
!rowspan="1" align="center" valign="top"|change
|-
!rowspan="5" align="left" valign="top"|House of Freedoms
|rowspan="5" valign="top"|2,557,622
|rowspan="5" valign="top"|44.8
|rowspan="5" valign="top"|33

|align="left"|Forza Italia
|valign="top"|15
|valign="top"|+5
|-
|align="left"|Lega Nord
|valign="top"|9
|valign="top"|-2
|-
|align="left"|National Alliance
|valign="top"|7
|valign="top"|+2
|-
|align="left"|Union of Christian and Centre Democrats
|valign="top"|1
|valign="top"|+1
|-
|align="left"|Italian Republican Party
|valign="top"|1
|valign="top"|=

|-
!rowspan="4" align="left" valign="top"|The Olive Tree
|rowspan="4" valign="top"|1,924,113
|rowspan="4" valign="top"|33.7
|rowspan="4" valign="top"|11

|align="left"|Democrats of the Left
|valign="top"|4
|valign="top"|-8
|-
|align="left"|Democracy is Freedom
|valign="top"|4
|valign="top"|-1
|-
|align="left"|Federation of the Greens
|valign="top"|2
|valign="top"|=
|-
|align="left"|Party of Italian Communists
|valign="top"|1
|valign="top"|+1

|-
!rowspan="1" align="left" valign="top"|Lega per l'Autonomia – Alleanza Lombarda
|rowspan="1" valign="top"|308,559
|rowspan="1" valign="top"|5.4
|rowspan="1" valign="top"|1

|align="left"|Lega per l'Autonomia – Alleanza Lombarda
|valign="top"|1
|valign="top"|+1

|-
!rowspan="1" align="left" valign="top"|Communist Refoundation Party
|rowspan="1" valign="top"|279,152
|rowspan="1" valign="top"|4.9
|rowspan="1" valign="top"|1

|align="left"|Communist Refoundation Party
|valign="top"|1
|valign="top"|=

|-
!rowspan="1" align="left" valign="top"|Italy of Values
|rowspan="1" valign="top"|180,828
|rowspan="1" valign="top"|3.2
|rowspan="1" valign="top"|1

|align="left"|Italy of Values
|valign="top"|1
|valign="top"|+1

|-
!rowspan="1" align="left" valign="top"|Others
|rowspan="1" valign="top"|459,023
|rowspan="1" valign="top"|8.0
|rowspan="1" valign="top"|-

|align="left"|Others
|valign="top"|-
|valign="top"|-

|- bgcolor="#E9E9E9"
!rowspan="1" align="left" valign="top"|Total coalitions
!rowspan="1" align="right" valign="top"|5,709,297
!rowspan="1" align="right" valign="top"|100.0
!rowspan="1" align="right" valign="top"|47
!rowspan="1" align="left" valign="top"|Total parties
!rowspan="1" align="right" valign="top"|47
!rowspan="1" align="right" valign="top"|=
|}
Sources: Italian Senate

Constituencies

|-
|- bgcolor="#E9E9E9"
!align="left" valign="top"|N°
!align="center" valign="top"|Constituency
!align="center" valign="top"|Winner
!align="center" valign="top"|Alliance
!align="center" valign="top"|Party
!align="center" valign="top"|Votes %
!align="center" valign="top"|Losers
|-
|align="left"|1
|align="left"|Milan Central
|align="left"|Marcello Dell'Utri
|align="center"|
|align="left"|Forza Italia
|align="left"|46.1%
|align="left"|A. Onofrio (Ulivo) 30.1%
|-
|align="left"|2
|align="left"|Milan East
|align="left"|Gianpiero Cantoni
|align="center"|
|align="left"|Forza Italia
|align="left"|49.2%
|align="left"|G. Malagoli (Ulivo) 33.9%
|-
|align="left"|3
|align="left"|Milan West
|align="left"|Riccardo De Corato
|align="center"|
|align="left"|National Alliance
|align="left"|51.2%
|align="left"|F. Besostri (Ulivo) 33.2%
|-
|align="left"|4
|align="left"|Milan South
|align="left"|Raffaele Iannuzzi
|align="center"|
|align="left"|Forza Italia
|align="left"|46.3%
|align="left"|A. Duva (Ulivo) 34.0%
|-
|align="left"|5
|align="left"|Milan North
|align="left"|Sergio Travaglia
|align="center"|
|align="left"|Forza Italia
|align="left"|44.0%
|align="left"|Gianfranco Pagliarulo (Ulivo) 35.9%  Luigi Malabarba (PRC) 6.8%
|-
|align="left"|6
|align="left"|Sesto San Giovanni
|align="left"|Antonio Del Pennino
|align="center"|
|align="left"|Italian Republican Party
|align="left"|42.9%
|align="left"|Antonio Pizzinato (Ulivo) 38.7%
|-
|align="left"|7
|align="left"|Lodi
|align="left"|Romano Comincioli
|align="center"|
|align="left"|Forza Italia
|align="left"|43.5%
|align="left"|Gianni Piatti (Ulivo) 36.2%
|-
|align="left"|8
|align="left"|Rozzano
|align="left"|Antonino Caruso
|align="center"|
|align="left"|National Alliance
|align="left"|46.2%
|align="left"|Ornella Piloni (Ulivo) 36.0%
|-
|align="left"|9
|align="left"|Abbiategrasso
|align="left"|Francesco Servello
|align="center"|
|align="left"|National Alliance
|align="left"|46.4%
|align="left"|G. Mainini (Ulivo) 33.0%
|-
|align="left"|10
|align="left"|Rho
|align="left"|Giuseppe Valditara
|align="center"|
|align="left"|National Alliance
|align="left"|44.2%
|align="left"|Roberto Biscardini (Ulivo) 35.3%
|-
|align="left"|11
|align="left"|Bollate
|align="left"|Cesarino Monti
|align="center"|
|align="left"|Lega Nord
|align="left"|44.5%
|align="left"|A. Pollio (Ulivo) 35.3%
|-
|align="left"|12
|align="left"|Cinisello Balsamo
|align="left"|Alberto Zorzoli
|align="center"|
|align="left"|Forza Italia
|align="left"|41.5%
|align="left"|Patrizia Toia (Ulivo) 40.6%
|-
|align="left"|13
|align="left"|Seregno
|align="left"|Enrico Rizzi
|align="center"|
|align="left"|Forza Italia
|align="left"|49.4%
|align="left"|L. Mariani (Ulivo) 29.6%
|-
|align="left"|14
|align="left"|Monza
|align="left"|Alfredo Mantica
|align="center"|
|align="left"|National Alliance
|align="left"|46.1%
|align="left"|Emanuela Baio (Ulivo) 35.4%
|-
|align="left"|15
|align="left"|Melzo
|align="left"|Luigi Scotti
|align="center"|
|align="left"|Forza Italia
|align="left"|41.5%
|align="left"|Loris Maconi (Ulivo) 38.4%
|-
|align="left"|16
|align="left"|Cologno Monzese
|align="left"|Enrico Pianetta
|align="center"|
|align="left"|Forza Italia
|align="left"|44.8%
|align="left"|Natale Ripamonti (Ulivo) 36.4%
|-
|align="left"|17
|align="left"|Varese
|align="left"|Piero Pellicini
|align="center"|
|align="left"|National Alliance
|align="left"|45.8%
|align="left"|M. Marzaro (Ulivo) 31.1%
|-
|align="left"|18
|align="left"|Gallarate
|align="left"|Luigi Peruzzotti
|align="center"|
|align="left"|Lega Nord
|align="left"|46.9%
|align="left"|M. Ampollini (Ulivo) 30.4%
|-
|align="left"|19
|align="left"|Busto Arsizio
|align="left"|Antonio Tomassini
|align="center"|
|align="left"|Forza Italia
|align="left"|46.6%
|align="left"|G. Canziani (Ulivo) 29.7%
|-
|align="left"|20
|align="left"|Como
|align="left"|Celestino Pedrazzini
|align="center"|
|align="left"|Lega Nord
|align="left"|48.4%
|align="left"|A. Rinaldi (Ulivo) 29.5%
|-
|align="left"|21
|align="left"|Cantù
|align="left"|Graziano Maffioli
|align="center"|
|align="left"|Union of Christian and Centre Democrats
|align="left"|45.7%
|align="left"|G. Ballabio (Ulivo) 31.0%
|-
|align="left"|22
|align="left"|Brescia
|align="left"|Paolo Guzzanti
|align="center"|
|align="left"|Forza Italia
|align="left"|42.8%
|align="left"|Pierluigi Petrini (Ulivo) 37.0%
|-
|align="left"|23
|align="left"|Lumezzane
|align="left"|Guglielmo Castagnetti
|align="center"|
|align="left"|Forza Italia
|align="left"|41.8%
|align="left"|A. Bonomelli (Ulivo) 33.6%
|-
|align="left"|24
|align="left"|Desenzano del Garda
|align="left"|Francesco Tirelli
|align="center"|
|align="left"|Lega Nord
|align="left"|44.8%
|align="left"|A. Zanelli (Ulivo) 32.5%
|-
|align="left"|25
|align="left"|Chiari
|align="left"|Sergio Agoni
|align="center"|
|align="left"|Lega Nord
|align="left"|45.7%
|align="left"|D. Buizza (Ulivo) 30.6%
|-
|align="left"|26
|align="left"|Suzzara
|align="left"|Franco Danieli
|align="center"|
|align="left"|Democracy is Freedom
|align="left"|38.6%
|align="left"|M. Pini (CdL) 37.5%
|-
|align="left"|27
|align="left"|Mantua
|align="left"|Anna Donati
|align="center"|
|align="left"|Federation of the Greens
|align="left"|42.1%
|align="left"|F. Scopelliti (CdL) 38.3%
|-
|align="left"|28
|align="left"|Cremona
|align="left"|Lamberto Grillotti
|align="center"|
|align="left"|National Alliance
|align="left"|41.8%
|align="left"|A. Rescaglio (Ulivo) 35.0%
|-
|align="left"|29
|align="left"|Pavia
|align="left"|Luigi Fabbri
|align="center"|
|align="left"|Forza Italia
|align="left"|44.8%
|align="left"|T. Montagna (Ulivo) 34.9%
|-
|align="left"|30
|align="left"|Vigevano
|align="left"|Domenico Contestabile
|align="center"|
|align="left"|Forza Italia
|align="left"|47.4%
|align="left"|M. Donato (Ulivo) 32.2%
|-
|align="left"|31
|align="left"|Bergamo
|align="left"|Vittorio Pessina
|align="center"|
|align="left"|Forza Italia
|align="left"|40.8%
|align="left"|G. Zilio (Ulivo) 33.7%
|-
|align="left"|32
|align="left"|Albino
|align="left"|Roberto Calderoli
|align="center"|
|align="left"|Lega Nord
|align="left"|44.2%
|align="left"|D. Carminati (Ulivo) 28.8%  Elidio De Paoli (LAL) 11.5%  Valerio Carrara (Italy of Values) 4.7%
|-
|align="left"|33
|align="left"|Treviglio
|align="left"|Ettore Pirovano
|align="center"|
|align="left"|Lega Nord
|align="left"|43.6%
|align="left"|C. Bonfichi (Ulivo) 28.4%
|-
|align="left"|34
|align="left"|Sondrio
|align="left"|Fiorello Provera
|align="center"|
|align="left"|Lega Nord
|align="left"|52.1%
|align="left"|E. Dioli (Ulivo) 28.0%
|-
|align="left"|35
|align="left"|Lecco
|align="left"|Roberto Castelli
|align="center"|
|align="left"|Lega Nord
|align="left"|41.7%
|align="left"|I. Bruseghini (Ulivo) 35.2%
|}

Additional senators
 The Olive Tree Patrizia Toia (Democracy is Freedom, 40.6%)
 Antonio Pizzinato (Democrats of the Left, 38.7%)
 Loris Maconi (Democrats of the Left, 38.4%)
 Pierluigi Petrini (Democracy is Freedom, 37.0%)
 Natale Ripamonti (Federation of the Greens, 36.4%)
 Gianni Piatti (Democrats of the Left, 36.2%)
 Ornella Piloni (Democrats of the Left, 36.0%)
 Gianfranco Pagliarulo (Party of Italian Communists, 35.9%)
 Emanuela Baio (Democracy is Freedom, 35.4%)
 Autonomous Lombard Alliance Elidio De Paoli (Lega per l'Autonomia – Alleanza Lombarda, 11.5%)
 Communist Refoundation Party Luigi Malabarba (Communist Refoundation Party, 6.8%)
 Italy of Values'''
 Valerio Carrara (Italy of Values, 4.7%)

Notes

Elections in Lombardy
2001 elections in Italy
May 2001 events in Europe